Baccharis glomeruliflora is a North American species of shrubs in the family Asteraceae known by the common name silverling. It is native to the coastal plain of the southeastern United States, from Mississippi to North Carolina.

Baccharis glomeruliflora is a shrub up to 300 cm (10 feet) tall. It has thick, leathery, evergreen leaves with large teeth, and flower heads clumped together in the axils of the leaves. It grows in swamps, hammocks, riverbanks, and other wet habitats.

References

External links
Atlas of Florida Vascular Plants
Pollen Library
Discover Life
Alabama Plant Atlas

glomeruliflora
Flora of the Southeastern United States
Plants described in 1803
Flora without expected TNC conservation status